Kiigumõisa Landscape Conservation Area is a nature park situated in Järva County, Estonia.

Its area is 170 ha.

The protected area was designated in 1981 to protect Kiigumõisa Springs and Määrasmäe springlike. In 2005, the protected area was redesigned to the landscape conservation area.

References

Nature reserves in Estonia
Geography of Järva County